The 2011 Sata Rally Azores, officially 46º Sata Rallye Açores, was the sixth round of the 2011 Intercontinental Rally Challenge (IRC) season. The 17-stage gravel rally took place on the island of São Miguel in the Azores between 14 and 16 July 2011.

Introduction
The rally was based in the major city of Ponta Delgada.

Results
Juho Hänninen won his third IRC rally of the season, having led the rally for most of the running, before Andreas Mikkelsen made a late charge for the lead. Hänninen held an advantage into the final day and after Mikkelsen took the lead for a period, Hänninen regained the lead for the final time. His victory gave him the championship lead by four points ahead of Bryan Bouffier. Bouffier finished the rally in fourth position, behind Mikkelsen and Jan Kopecký.

Overall

Special stages

References

External links 
 The official website for the rally
 The official website of the Intercontinental Rally Challenge

Azores
Rally Azores
Rallye Açores